The Molucca Sea (Indonesian: Laut Maluku) is located in the western Pacific Ocean, around the vicinity of Indonesia, specifically bordered by the Indonesian Islands of Celebes (Sulawesi) to the west, Halmahera to the east, and the Sula Islands to the south. The Molucca Sea has a total surface area of 77,000 square miles (200,000 square km). The Molucca Sea is rich in coral and has many diving sites due to the deepness of its waters. The deepness of the water explains the reasoning behind dividing the sea into three zones, which functions to transport water from the Pacific Ocean to the shallower seas surrounding it. The deepest hollow in the Molucca Sea is the 15,780-foot (4,810-meter) Batjan (Indonesian: Bacan) basin. This region is known for its periodic experiences of earthquakes, which stems from the sea itself being a micro plate, in which the Molucca Sea is being subducted in two opposite directions: one in the direction of the Eurasian Plate to the west and the other in the direction of the Philippine Sea Plate to the east.

Location
The Molucca Sea borders the Banda Sea to the south and the Celebes Sea to the west. To the north is Philippine Sea and to the east is Halmahera Sea.

The islands bordering the Molucca Sea include Halmahera to the north east, Buru and Ceram in the centre, and Sulawesi to the west. The Talaud Islands to the north are considered to be the northern border the sea, though the Molucca Sea Plate, the tectonic plate named after the sea, extends further north.

The International Hydrographic Organization (IHO) defines the "Molukka Sea" as being one of the waters of the East Indian Archipelago. The IHO defines its limits as follows:
On the North. By a line from the Northeast extreme of Celebes [Sulawesi] through the Siau Islands to the South point of Sangi thence to the Southern extreme of the Talaud Group, through these islands to their Northeastern extreme and thence a line to Tanjong Sopi, the Northern point of Morotai Island.

On the East. By the West coast of Morotai from Tanjong Sopi as far south as Wajaboela, thence a line to the Northern point of Halmahera and down its West coast to Tanjong Libolo, its Southern extreme.

On the South. A line from the Southern extreme of Halmahera to the North point of Bisa (Setile) Island, thence to the Northern extreme of Obi Major, through this island to Tanjong Ake Lamo, its Southwestern point, thence to Tanjong Dehekolano, the Eastern extremity of the Soela [Sula] Islands, along their Northern coasts to Tanjong Marikasoe, the Western extreme, thence a line to the Southeast point of Banggai Island.

On the West. The East coasts of Banggai and Peleng Islands to North Bangkalan thence a line to Tg. Botok (Celebes) round the coast to Tg. Pasir Pandjang and across to Tg. Tombalilatoe on the opposite coast, thence up the East coast to Tg. Poeisan, the Northeastern extreme of Celebes.

History
The Portuguese, Dutch, British, and Spanish Empires fought each other for control of the spice islands that can only be accessed through the Molucca Sea.

Earthquakes

January 6, 2019, measuring 7.0, with no tsunamis resulting. 

The sea is a very seismically active area due to the Molucca Sea Plate.

See also
Strait of Malacca, which is west of Singapore.

Notes

References 
 Molucca Sea

 
Seas of Indonesia
Landforms of Maluku (province)
Landforms of Sulawesi
Maritime Southeast Asia